SAPSAN was an airline of Kazakhstan, named after the peregrine falcon (Сапсан in Russian). It was founded in 2009 and that started operations in 2010.
Based in Almaty International Airport and owned by the same parent company that owns Irtysh Air, the airline leased its aircraft to Irtysh Air to operate 5 domestic routes from Almaty (Kostanay, Karaganda, Oskemen, Kyzylorda and Pavlodar.

Destinations
Kazakhstan
Almaty - Almaty International Airport [base]
Karagandy - Sary-Arka Airport
Kostanay - Kostanay Airport
Kyzylorda - Kyzylorda Airport
Pavlodar - Pavlodar Airport

Fleet
As of November 2012, the fleet of SAPSAN is stored and aircraft are to be returned to the manufacturer, Bombardier.
The SAPSAN airlines fleet consists the following aircraft:

References

External links

Airlines of Kazakhstan
Airlines established in 2009